Rickmansworth School in Croxley Green, Hertfordshire, is a coeducational secondary school and a sixth form with academy status for 1,400 pupils.

Rickmansworth is a secondary school for boys and girls aged 11 to 18 of all academic abilities, although 25% of the 11+ intake are selected using tests in mathematics and verbal reasoning, with a further 10% selected for aptitude in music.  Most children are admitted at 11 and there is an additional intake at 16 into the Sixth Form. 
Rickmansworth is a self-governing academy school and the governing body are responsible for the employment of staff, the admission of pupils, and all aspects of the organisation and running of the School. Previously the school was a 'grant maintained school' in the 1990s, with much the same powers.

Location 
The school stands in twenty-six acres of Metropolitan Green Belt woodland situated in a residential area well served by road and rail, on the south side of the A412 road. The M25 motorway is five minutes distance by car, and Croxley and Rickmansworth Metropolitan line stations are ten- and fifteen-minute walks respectively. Watford Junction station (National Rail to London Euston) is fifteen to twenty minutes by car.

History

Grammar school (1953–1969)
Rickmansworth Grammar School was the fifth grammar school to be built after the war.
The school was built on the site of a house called Briery Close, which had been the residence of the vicar of Rickmansworth but had fallen vacant before the war.
Because building at the site ran late, the first intake in September 1953 was housed in a school in Oxhey, until the Scots Hill premises opened in September 1954.
The school was formally opened on 20 June 1956 by Countess Mountbatten of Burma.

Comprehensive (1969–2011)
In September 1969 the school ceased to be academically selective and became fully comprehensive. The School was maintained as a county school by the Hertfordshire local education authority until September 1990, when it was among the first schools in the country to take advantage of the opportunity offered by grant-maintained status to become a self-governing school.

In 2003 the school was designated as a specialist Arts College, with a major focus on performing arts, and in April 2008 was awarded a second specialism as in Science. The school continues with the specialisms today.

Academy (2011-) 
On 1 April 2011, Rickmansworth School officially converted to an academy.

In May 2013, Dr Stephen Burton, who had been headmaster for 13 years, had decided to step down. In July 2013, it was announced that Mr Keith Douglas was to become the school's new headmaster in January 2014.

Flora advertising campaign 
On 22 May 2007, the school's 7th, 8th and 9th years participated in a Flora advertising campaign whereby a photo of the three-year groups was taken to be displayed on approximately 600 billboards around the UK, with text beneath likely saying "Two-thirds of them will end up with raised cholesterol."

Mitchell and Webb 
The school appeared in an episode of the BBC comedy That Mitchell and Webb Look in the sketch "The Surprising Adventures of Sir Digby Chicken-Caesar", in which the heroic duo break into the house of an elderly woman, tie her up and pretend that they are visiting "Dear Auntie Marigold". They steal her television and are pursued. Ginger is beaten up. They break into Rickmansworth School and steal scientific equipment in order to make crystal meth.

Academic results
Its standing in comparison with the national average is very favourable at GCSE level and A Level. Its results at GCSE and A level are similar to a grammar school.

Notable alumni
 George Banks, actor, Coronation Street
 Phil Clarke, Head of Comedy since 2013 at Channel 4, producer of Peep Show
 Adam Godley, actor
 Adrian Newman, Church of England bishop
 Nick Stringer, England international and London Wasps rugby player
 Kyla La Grange, singer
 Dr. Ken Smith (Teacher at the school), First Chairman of Bury Lake Young Mariners

References

External links
 EduBase

Schools in Three Rivers District
Academies in Hertfordshire
Educational institutions established in 1954
1954 establishments in England
Secondary schools in Hertfordshire
Rickmansworth